Oberspreewald-Lausitz is a Kreis (district) in the southern part of Brandenburg, Germany. Neighboring districts are (from the north clockwise) Dahme-Spreewald, Spree-Neiße, the districts Bautzen and Meissen in Saxony, and the district Elbe-Elster.

Geography
The Spree river runs through the district; along its banks there is the Spreewald, a wooded area and habitat of several rare animals. The district is part of the historic region of Lusatia.

History
The district was formed in 1993 by merging the previous districts of Calau and Senftenberg and a small part of the district Bad Liebenwerda.

Demography

Coat of arms

The coat of arms shows a red bull as the symbol of the Lower Lusatia region, representing the former district Calau. The city wall in the bottom part is an old symbol of the Upper Lusatia region, and also represents the former district Senftenberg. The shield with a lion is the symbol of the county of Meißen, representing the municipalities of the former district Bad Liebenwerda which were included into the district.

Towns and municipalities

References

External links

 Official website (German)